This is an incomplete list of artists in the collection of the Mauritshuis, with the number of artworks represented, and sorted by century of birth. The list also reflects artists whose works were formerly in the collection, or whose works were copied by other artists in the collection. For more information about the collection, see Mauritshuis. The collection includes over 800 paintings, 50 miniatures, 20 sculptures and a few drawings and prints. Of the over 300 artists in the collection, only five women are represented: Marie-Anne Collot, Judith Leyster, Maria van Oosterwijck, Clara Peeters, and Rachel Ruysch.

Born in the 15th century 
Barbari, Jacopo de' (Venezia, ca. 1445 – Brussels, 1516), 1 work
Bening, Alexander (Ghent, 1415 – Bruges, 1519), 1 work
Benson, Ambrosius (Lombardy, 1484 – Bruges, 1550), 1 work
Bouts, Aelbert (Leuven, 1451 – Leuven, 1549), 1 work
Bouts, Dieric (Haarlem, 1415 – Leuven, 1475), 1 work
Bruyn, Bartholomäus (Cologne, 1493 – Cologne, 1553), 1 work
Cleve, Joos van (Kleef, 1485 – Antwerp, 1541), 2 works
Cock, Jan Wellens de (Leiden, 1480 – Antwerp, 1527), 3 works
Cornelisz. genaamd Kunst, Cornelis (Leiden, 1493 – Leiden, 1544), 3 works
Antonio da Correggio (Correggio, 1489 – Correggio, 1534), 1 work
Cranach, Lucas (Kronach, 1472 – Weimar, 1553), 2 works
David, Gerard (Oudewater, 1460 – Bruges, 1523), 6 works
Dürer, Albrecht (Nuremberg, 1471 – Nuremberg, 1528), 2 works
Giorgione (Castelfranco, 1477 – Venice, 1510), 1 work
Gossaert, Jan (Maubeuge, 1478 – Middelburg, 1532), 4 works
Heemskerck, Maarten van (Heemskerk, 1498 – Haarlem, 1574), 4 works
Holbein, Hans (Augsberg, 1497 – London, 1543), 3 works
Isenbrant, Adriaen (Bruges, 1485 – Bruges, 1551), 1 work
Kulmbach, Hans Süss von (Kulmbach, ca. 1480 – Nürnberg, 1522), 3 works
Massijs, Quinten (Leuven, 1466 – Antwerp, 1530), 2 works
Master of Alkmaar (Alkmaar, 1475 – Alkmaar, 1515), 6 works
Master of Frankfurt (1460 – 1520), 4 works
Master of the legend of St. Barbara (1470 – 1500), 1 work
Memling, Hans (Seligenstadt, 1430 – Bruges, 1494), 1 work
Patinir, Joachim (Antwerp, 1480 – Antwerp, 1524), 1 work
Piero di Cosimo (Florence, 1462 – Florence, 1521), 2 works
Provoost, Jan (Mons, 1462 – Bruges, 1529), 2 works
Sittow, Michiel (Reval, 1469 – Tallinn, 1525), 1 work
Swart van Groningen, Jan (Groningen, 1495 – Antwerp, 1560), 1 work
Weyden, Rogier van der (Tournai, 1400 – Brussels, 1464), 1 work

Born in the 16th century
Aertsen, Pieter (Amsterdam, 1508 – Amsterdam, 1575), 1 work
Amstel, Jan van (Amsterdam, 1500 – Antwerp, 1540), 1 work
Anonymous Antwerp Mannerist (Antwerp, 1500 – Antwerp, 1530), 3 works
Ast, Balthasar van der (Middelburg, 1593 – Delft, 1656), 4 works
Avercamp, Hendrick (Amsterdam, 1585 – Kampen, 1634), 1 work
Balen, Hendrick van (Antwerp, 1575 – Antwerp, 1632), 4 works
Bassen, Bartholomeus van (Antwerp, 1590 – The Hague, 1652), 1 work
Berghe, Christoffel van den (Middelburg, 1590 – Middelburg, 1638), 1 work
Beuckelaer, Joachim (Antwerp, 1533 – Antwerp, 1574), 2 works
Bles, Herri met de (Dinant, 1510 – Antwerp, 1510), 1 work
Bloemaert, Abraham (Gorinchem, 1564 – Utrecht, 1651), 3 works
Bosschaert, Ambrosius (Antwerp, 1573 – The Hague, 1621), 1 work
Bray, Salomon de (Amsterdam, 1597 – Haarlem, 1664), 1 work
Breenbergh, Bartholomeus (Deventer, 1598 – Amsterdam, 1657), 3 works
Bril, Paul (Antwerp, 1554 – Rome, 1626), 1 work
Brueghel, Jan (Brussels, 1568 – Antwerp, 1624), 9 works
Terbrugghen, Hendrick (Deventer, 1588 – Utrecht, 1629), 1 work
Bunel, Francois II (Blois, 1500 – Blois, 1550), 1 work
Cambiaso, Luca (Genova, 1527 – Madrid, 1585), 2 works
Campen, Jacob van (Haarlem, 1595 – Amersfoort, 1657), 2 works
Carracci, Annibale (Bologna, 1560 – Rome, 1609), 1 work
Claesz., Pieter (Berchem, 1597 – Haarlem, 1660), 4 works
Codde, Pieter (Amsterdam, 1599 – Amsterdam, 1678), 3 works
Cornelis, Albert (Bruges, 1500 – Bruges, 1532), 1 work
Cornelisz. van Haarlem, Cornelis (Haarlem, 1562 – Haarlem, 1637), 6 works
Droochsloot, Joost Cornelisz. (Utrecht, 1630 – Utrecht, 1673), 1 work
Duyster, Willem Cornelisz. (Amsterdam, 1599 – Amsterdam, 1635), 1 work
Dyck, Anthony van (Antwerp, 1599 – London, 1641), 9 works
Eertvelt, Andries van (Antwerp, 1590 – Antwerp, 1652), 1 work
Elsheimer, Adam (Frankfurt, 1578 – Rome, 1610), 2 works
Fogolino, Marcello (Vicenza, ca. 1485 – Vicenza, after 1548), 1 work
Francken, Frans (Antwerp, 1581 – Antwerp, 1642), 2 works
Gheyn, Jacob de (Antwerp, 1565 – The Hague, 1629), 1 work
Goltzius, Hendrick (Venlo, 1558 – Haarlem, 1617), 3 works
Govaerts, Abraham (Antwerp, 1589 – Antwerp, 1626), 1 work
Goyen, Jan Josefsz. van (Leiden, 1596 – The Hague, 1656), 10 works
Haecht, Willem van (Antwerp, 1593 – Antwerp, 1637), 1 work
Hals, Dirck (Haarlem, 1591 – Haarlem, 1656), 6 works
Hals, Frans (Antwerp, 1582 – Haarlem, 1666), 5 works
Heda, Willem Claesz. (Haarlem, 1594 – Haarlem, 1680), 2 works
Hemessen, Jan van (Hemiksem, 1500 – Haarlem, 1575), 2 works
Hillegaert, Paulus van (Amsterdam, 1596 – Amsterdam, 1640), 1 work
Honthorst, Gerard van (Utrecht, 1592 – Utrecht, 1656), 7 works
Jonson van Ceulen, Cornelis (London, 1593 – Utrecht, 1661), 1 work
Jordaens, Jacob (Antwerp, 1593 – Antwerp, 1678), 3 works
Key, Adriaen Thomasz. (Antwerp, 1544 – Antwerp, 1589), 1 work
Keyser, Hendrik de (Utrecht, 1565 – Amsterdam, 1621), 2 works
Keyser, Thomas de (Amsterdam, 1596 – Amsterdam, 1667), 5 works
Laer, Pieter van (Haarlem, 1592 – Haarlem, 1642), 1 work
Lapp, Jan Willemsz. (The Hague, 1585 – Amsterdam, 1663), 3 works
Lastman, Pieter (Amsterdam, 1583 – Amsterdam, 1633), 1 work
Lisse, Dirck van der (The Hague, 1607 – The Hague, 1669), 1 work
Master of the Brandon Portrait (1500 – 1530), 1 work
Master of the Female Half-Lengths (Antwerp, 1500 – Antwerp, 1540), 2 works
Mierevelt, Michiel Jansz. van (Delft, 1567 – Delft, 1641), 10 works
Moeyaert, Nicolaes (Durgerdam, 1592 – Amsterdam, 1655), 3 works
Mol, Peter van (1599 – 1650), 1 work
Momper, Joos de (Antwerp, 1564 – Antwerp, 1635), 1 work
Amstel, Jan van (Amsterdam, 1500 – Antwerp, 1540), 1 work
Moreelse, Paulus (Utrecht, 1571 – Utrecht, 1638), 3 works
Moro, Antonio (Utrecht, 1520 – Antwerp, 1576), 2 works
Peeters, Clara (Antwerp, 1580 – Antwerp, 1641), 3 works
Pietersz., Pieter (Antwerp, 1540 – Amsterdam, 1603), 5 works
Poelenburch, Cornelis van (Utrecht, 1595 – Utrecht, 1667), 3 works
Porcellis, Jan (Ghent, 1584 – Zoeterwoude, 1632), 1 work
Pot, Hendrik Cornelisz (Amsterdam, 1585 – Amsterdam, 1657), 5 works
Pourbus, Pieter (Gouda, 1523 – Bruges, 1584), 1 work
Ravesteyn, Jan Antonisz. van (The Hague, 1572 – The Hague, 1657), 9 works
Rottenhammer, Hans (Munich, 1564 – Augsburg, 1625), 2 works
Rubens, Peter Paul (Antwerp, 1577 – Antwerp, 1640), 15 works
Saenredam, Pieter Jansz. (Assendelft, 1597 – Haarlem, 1665), 1 work
Savery, Jacob (Kortrijk, 1565 – Amsterdam, 1603), 1 work
Savery, Roelant (Kortrijk, 1576 – Utrecht, 1639), 3 works
Seghers, Daniël (Antwerp, 1590 – Antwerp, 1661), 2 works
Snijders, Frans (Antwerp, 1579 – Antwerp, 1657), 2 works
Soutman, Pieter Claesz. (Haarlem, 1580 – Haarlem, 1657), 1 work
Velde, Esaias van de (Amsterdam, 1587 – The Hague, 1630), 2 works
Velázquez, Diego Rodriguez de Silva y (Sevilla, 1599 – Madrid, 1660), 1 work
Venne, Adriaen Pietersz. van de (Delft, 1589 – The Hague, 1662), 1 work
Verspronck, Johannes Cornelisz. (Haarlem, 1600 – Haarlem, 1662), 3 works
Verstraelen, Anthonie (Gorinchem, 1593 – Amsterdam, 1641), 1 work
Vinckboons, David (Mechelen, 1576 – Amsterdam, 1629), 2 works
Vos, Cornelis de (Hulst, 1584 – Antwerp, 1651), 1 work
Vos, Maerten de (Antwerp, 1532 – Antwerp, 1603), 1 work
Vos, Paul de (Hulst, 1593 – Antwerp, 1678), 2 works
Voskuijl, Huijgh Pietersz. (1591 – 1665), 1 work
Vredeman de Vries, Paul (Antwerp, 1567 – Amsterdam, 1617), 1 work
Wildens, Jan (Antwerp, 1595 – Antwerp, 1653), 1 work
Willaerts, Adam (London, 1577 – Utrecht, 1664), 1 work

Born in the 17th century
Aelst, Willem van (Delft, 1627 – Amsterdam, 1683), 2 works
Anraedt, Pieter van (Utrecht, 1635 – Deventer, 1678), 1 work
Asselijn, Jan (Diemen or Dieppe, 1615 – Amsterdam, 1652), 1 work
Backer, Jacob Adriaensz. (Harlingen, 1608 – Amsterdam, 1651), 4 works
Baen, Jan de (Haarlem, 1633 – The Hague, 1702), 2 works
Bakhuizen, Ludolf (Emden, 1631 – Amsterdam, 1708), 3 works
Beest, Sybrand van (c.1610 – 1674), 1 work
Beijeren, Leendert van (Amsterdam, 1619 – Amsterdam, 1649), 6 works
Bellevois, Jacob Adriaensz. (Rotterdam, 1621 – Rotterdam, 1676), 1 work
Berchem, Nicolaes Pietersz. (Haarlem, 1620 – Amsterdam, 1683), 4 works
Berckheyde, Gerrit Adriaensz. (Haarlem, 1638 – Haarlem, 1698), 2 works
Berckheyde, Job Adriaensz. (Haarlem, 1630 – Haarlem, 1692), 1 work
Berckman, Hendrick (Klundert, 1629 – Middelburg, 1678), 1 work
Bol, Ferdinand (Dordrecht, 1616 – Amsterdam, 1680), 10 works
Bor, Paulus (Amersfoort, 1601 – Amersfoort, 1669), 1 work
Borch, Gerard ter (Zwolle, 1617 – Deventer, 1681), 6 works
Borssom, Anthonie van (Amsterdam, 1631 – Amsterdam, 1677), 1 work
Both, Jan (Utrecht, 1618 – Utrecht, 1652), 1 work
Brakenburgh, Richard (Haarlem, 1650 – Haarlem, 1702), 1 work
Bray, Dirck de (Haarlem, 1635 – Haarlem, 1694), 1 work
Bray, Jan de (Haarlem, 1627 – Haarlem, 1697), 2 works
Brekelenkam, Quiringh Gerritsz. van (Zwammerdam, 1622 – Leiden, 1670), 1 work
Brouwer, Adriaen (Oudenaarde, 1605 – Antwerp, 1638), 4 works
Calraet, Abraham van (Dordrecht, 1642 – Dordrecht, 1722), 1 work
Cappelle, Jan van de (Amsterdam, 1626 – Amsterdam, 1679), 3 works
Cerezo, Mateo the Younger (Burgos, 1637 – Madrid, 1666), 1 work
Collier, Edwaert (Breda, 1642 – London, 1708), 1 work
Cooghen, Leendert van der (Haarlem, 1632 – Haarlem, 1681), 1 work
Cooper, Samuel (London, 1609 – London, 1672), 1 work
Coorte, Adriaen (Middelburg, 1660 – Middelburg, 1707), 6 works
Coques, Gonzales (Antwerp, 1614 – Antwerp, 1683), 1 work
Cuylenborch, Abraham van (Utrecht, ca. 1610 – Utrecht, 1658), 1 work
Cuyp, Aelbert (Dordrecht, 1620 – Dordrecht, 1691), 6 works
Delen, Dirck van (Heusden, 1605 – Arnemuiden, 1671), 2 works
Dijk, Philip van (Oud-Beijerland, 1683 – The Hague, 1753), 6 works
Does, Simon van der (The Hague, 1653 – Antwerp, 1717), 1 work
Dou, Gerard (Leiden, 1613 – Leiden, 1675), 7 works
Drost, Willem (Amsterdam, 1633 – Amsterdam, 1659), 1 work
Dubois, Guillam (Haarlem, 1623 – Haarlem, 1661), 2 works
Dujardin, Karel (Amsterdam, 1626 – Venice, 1678), 3 works
Dusart, Cornelis (Haarlem, 1660 – Haarlem, 1704), 1 work
Eckhout, Albert (Groningen, 1610 – Groningen, 1665), 1 work
Eeckhout, Gerbrand van den (Amsterdam, 1621 – Amsterdam, 1674), 2 works
Ehrenberg, Wilhelm Schubert van (1630 – 1687), 1 work
Everdingen, Allaert van (Alkmaar, 1621 – Amsterdam, 1675), 1 work
Everdingen, Cesar Boetius van (Alkmaar, 1617 – Alkmaar, 1678), 3 works
Fabritius, Barent (Middenbeemster, 1624 – Amsterdam, 1673), 1 work
Fabritius, Carel (Middenbeemster, 1622 – Delft, 1654), 4 works
Fijt, Joannes (Antwerp, 1611 – Antwerp, 1661), 3 works
Flinck, Govert (Cleves, 1615 – Amsterdam, 1660), 6 works
Gelder, Aert de (Dordrecht, 1645 – Dordrecht, 1727), 4 works
Glauber, Johannes (Utrecht, 1646 – Schoonhoven, 1726), 5 works
Haagen, Joris van der (Arnhem, 1615 – The Hague, 1669), 2 works
Hackaert, Jan (Amsterdam, 1628 – Amsterdam, 1685), 1 work
Haensbergen, Jan van (Gorinchem, 1642 – The Hague, 1705), 3 works
Hals, Nicolaes (Haarlem, 1628 – Haarlem, 1686), 1 work
Hanneman, Adriaen (The Hague, 1603 – The Hague, 1671), 5 works
Heda, Gerret Willemsz. (Haarlem, 1622 – Haarlem, 1649), 1 work
Heem, Cornelis de (Leiden, 1631 – Antwerp, 1695), 1 work
Heem, Jan Davidsz. de (Utrecht, 1606 – Antwerp, 1683), 3 works
Heerschop, Hendrick (Haarlem, 1626 – Haarlem, 1690), 1 work
Helst, Bartholomeus van der (Haarlem, 1613 – Amsterdam, 1670), 3 works
Heusch, Willem de (Utrecht, 1625 – Utrecht, 1692), 2 works
Heyden, Jan van der (Gorinchem, 1637 – Amsterdam, 1712), 2 works
Hobbema, Meindert (Amsterdam, 1638 – Amsterdam, 1709), 3 works
Hondecoeter, Gijsbert Gillisz. de (Utrecht, 1604 – Utrecht, 1653), 1 work
Hondecoeter, Melchior d' (Utrecht, 1636 – Amsterdam, 1695), 4 works
Hooch, Pieter de (Rotterdam, 1629 – Amsterdam, 1683), 2 works
Huchtenburg, Jacob van (Haarlem, 1644 – Amsterdam, 1675), 3 works
Huysum, Jan van (Amsterdam, 1682 – Amsterdam, 1749), 5 works
Kalf, Willem (Rotterdam, 1619 – Amsterdam, 1693), 6 works
Keirincx, Alexander (Antwerp, 1600 – Amsterdam, 1652), 1 work
Kessel, Jan (Amsterdam, 1641 – Amsterdam, 1680), 1 work
Koninck, Philips (Amsterdam, 1619 – Amsterdam, 1688), 1 work
Koninck, Salomon (Amsterdam, 1609 – Amsterdam, 1656), 1 work
Lairesse, Gerard de (Liège, 1640 – Amsterdam, 1711), 2 works
Leyster, Judith (Haarlem, 1609 – Heemstede, 1660), 1 work
Lievens, Jan (Leiden, 1607 – Amsterdam, 1674), 2 works
Lingelbach, Johannes (Frankfurt am Main, 1622 – Amsterdam, 1674), 4 works
Logteren, Ignatius van (Amsterdam, 1685 – Amsterdam, 1732), 1 work
Loo, Jacob van (Sluis, 1614 – Paris, 1670), 2 works
Luttichuys, Isaack (London, 1616 – Amsterdam, 1673), 1 work
Maes, Nicolaes (Dordrecht, 1634 – Amsterdam, 1693), 6 works
Man, Cornelis de (Delft, 1621 – Delft, 1706), 1 work
Mancadan, Jacob Sibrandi (Minnertsga, 1602 – Tjerkgaast, 1680), 2 works
Marseus van Schrieck, Otto (Nijmegen, 1619 – Amsterdam, 1678), 1 work
Mazo, Juan Bautista Martinez del (Cuenza, 1610/15 – Madrid, 1667), 1 work
Metsu, Gabriël (Leiden, 1629 – Amsterdam, 1667), 3 works
Mieris, Frans van (Leiden, 1635 – Leiden, 1681), 5 works
Mieris, Willem van (Leiden, 1662 – Leiden, 1747), 2 works
Mignon, Abraham (Frankfurt am Main, 1640 – Utrecht, 1679), 3 works
Mijtens, Johannes (The Hague, 1614 – The Hague, 1670), 5 works
Molenaer, Jan Miense (Haarlem, 1610 – Haarlem, 1688), 7 works
Moni, Louis de (Breda, 1698 – Leiden, 1771), 2 works
Moreelse, Johan (1612 – 1634), 1 work
Morel, Jean Baptiste (Antwerp, 1662 – Brussels, 1732), 2 works
Moucheron, Frederik de (Emden, 1633 – Amsterdam, 1686), 2 works
Mulier, Pieter (Haarlem, 1600 – Haarlem, 1659), 1 work
Murillo, Bartolomé Esteban (Sevilla, 1617 – Sevilla, 1682), 1 work
Musscher, Michiel van (Rotterdam, 1645 – Amsterdam, 1705), 2 works
Nason, Pieter (1612 – 1690), 2 works
Neer, Aert van der (Amsterdam, 1603 – Amsterdam, 1677), 3 works
Neer, Eglon van der (Amsterdam, 1634 – Düsseldorf, 1703), 2 works
Netscher, Caspar (Heidelberg, 1639 – The Hague, 1684), 4 works
Netscher, Constantijn (The Hague, 1668 – The Hague, 1723), 2 works
Nickelen, Jan van (Haarlem, 1655 – Kassel, 1721), 1 work
Noort, Pieter van (1622 – 1672), 1 work
Ochtervelt, Jacob (Rotterdam, 1634 – Amsterdam, 1682), 1 work
Oever, Hendrick ten (Zwolle, 1639 – Zwolle, 1716), 1 work
Olis, Jan (Gorinchem, 1610 – Heusden, 1676), 1 work
Oliver, Peter (London, 1594 – London, 1647), 2 works
Oost, Jacob van (Bruges, 1603 – Bruges, 1671), 1 work
Oosterwijck, Maria van (Nootdorp, 1630 – Uitdam, 1693), 2 works
Ostade, Adriaen van (Haarlem, 1610 – Haarlem, 1685), 4 works
Ostade, Isaac van (Haarlem, 1621 – Haarlem, 1649), 3 works
Palamedesz., Anthonie (Delft, 1601 – Amsterdam, 1673), 2 works
Pellegrini GA, Giovanni Antonio (Venezia, 1675 – Venezia, 1741), 1 work
Pierson, Christoffel (The Hague, 1631 – Gouda, 1714), 1 work
Pijnacker, Adam (Schiedam, 1622 – Amsterdam, 1673), 1 work
Pluym, Karel van der (Leiden, 1625 – Leiden, 1672), 1 work
Poel, Egbert Lievensz. van der (Delft, 1621 – Rotterdam, 1664), 1 work
Poorter, Willem de (Haarlem, 1608 – Heusden, 1649), 1 work
Post, Frans Jansz. (Leiden, 1612 – Haarlem, 1680), 2 works
Post, Pieter Jansz. (Haarlem, 1608 – The Hague, 1669), 2 works
Potter, Paulus (Enkhuizen, 1625 – Amsterdam, 1654), 4 works
Quast, Pieter Jansz. (Amsterdam, 1606 – Amsterdam, 1647), 2 works
Ragueneau, Abraham (London, 1623 – London, 1690), 1 work
Ravesteyn, Arnold van (The Hague, 1605 – The Hague, 1690), 1 work
Rembrandt, Rembrandt (Leiden, 1606 – Amsterdam, 1669), 21 works
Renesse, Constantijn à (Maarssen, 1626 – Eindhoven, 1680), 1 work
Rousseaux, Jacques des (Tourcoing, 1600 – Leiden, 1638), 1 work
Ruisdael, Jacob Isaacksz. van (Haarlem, 1628 – Haarlem, 1682), 6 works
Ruysch, Rachel (The Hague, 1664 – Amsterdam, 1750), 2 works
Ruysdael, Salomon van (Naarden, 1602 – Haarlem, 1670), 3 works
Saftleven, Cornelis (Gorinchem, 1607 – Rotterdam, 1681), 1 work
Schalcken, Godfried (Made, 1643 – The Hague, 1706), 5 works
Steen, Jan Havicksz. (Leiden, 1626 – Leiden, 1679), 13 works
Steenwijck, Harmen (Delft, 1612 – Leiden, 1656), 1 work
Stoop, Dirk (Utrecht, 1615 – Utrecht, 1686), 1 work
Storck, Abraham (Amsterdam, 1644 – Amsterdam, 1708), 2 works
Sweerts, Michael (Brussels, 1618 – Goa, 1664), 3 works
Tempel, Abraham van den (Leeuwarden, 1622 – Amsterdam, 1672), 3 works
Teniers, David (Antwerp, 1610 – Brussels, 1690), 4 works
Terwesten, Augustinus (The Hague, 1649 – Berlin, 1711), 1 work
Thopas, Jan (1620 – 1690), 1 work
Tilborgh, Gillis van (1615 – 1675), 1 work
Tol, Domenicus van (Bodegraven, 1635 – Leiden, 1676), 1 work
Troost, Cornelis (Amsterdam, 1697 – Amsterdam, 1750), 1 work
Ulft, Jacob van der (Gorinchem, 1627 – Noordwijk, 1690), 1 work
Velde, Adriaen van de (Amsterdam, 1636 – Amsterdam, 1672), 3 works
Velde, Willem van de (Leiden, 1633 – Londen, 1707), 5 works
Verhulst, Rombout (Mechelen, 1624 – The Hague, 1698), 5 works
Verkolje, Jan (Amsterdam, 1650 – Delft, 1693), 1 work
Vermeer van Haarlem, Jan (Haarlem, 1628 – Haarlem, 1691), 1 work
Vermeer, Johannes (Delft, 1632 – Delft, 1675), 4 works
Verschuring, Hendrick (Gorinchem, 1627 – Dordrecht, 1690), 1 work
Vlieger, Simon de (Rotterdam, 1600 – Weesp, 1653), 1 work
Vliet, Jan Gillisz. van (Leiden, 1605 – Leiden, 1668), 1 work
Vois, Ary de (Utrecht, 1641 – Leiden, 1680), 1 work
Vonck, Elias (Amsterdam, 1605 – Amsterdam, 1652), 1 work
Weenix, Jan (Amsterdam, 1640 – Amsterdam, 1719), 3 works
Weenix, Jan Baptist (Amsterdam, 1621 – Utrecht, 1661), 3 works
Werff, Adriaen van der (Kralingen, 1659 – Rotterdam, 1722), 2 works
Wijck, Thomas (Beverwijk, 1616 – Haarlem, 1677), 1 work
Wijnants, Jan (Haarlem, 1632 – Amsterdam, 1684), 1 work
Willeboirts Bosschaert, Thomas (Bergen op Zoom, 1613 – Antwerp, 1654), 3 works
Wouwerman, Philips (Haarlem, 1619 – Haarlem, 1668), 11 works
Wtenbrouck, Moyses van (The Hague, 1590 – The Hague, 1648), 2 works
Zijl, Gerard Pietersz. van (Haarlem, 1609 – Amsterdam, 1665), 1 work

Born in the 18th century
Aved, Jacques André Joseph Camellot (Douai, 1702 – Paris, 1766), 1 work
Baur, Nicolaas (1767 – 1820), 1 work
Collot, Marie-Anne (Paris, 1748 – Nancy, 1821), 1 work
Croix, Pierre Frédéric de la (1709 – 1782), 1 work
Defrance, Léonard (1735 – 1805), 1 work
Geeraerts, Martinus Josephus (1707 – 1791), 1 work
Haag, Tethart Philipp Christian (Kassel, 1737 – The Hague, 1812), 1 work
Hendriks, Wybrand (Amsterdam, 1744 – Haarlem, 1831), 2 works
Kobell, Hendrik (Rotterdam, 1751 – Rotterdam, 1779), 1 work
Mijn, Frans van der (Dusseldorp, 1719 – London, 1783), 1 work
Mijn, George van der (London, 1723 – Amsterdam, 1763), 2 works
Schweickhardt, Hendrik Willem (1747 – 1797), 1 work
Tischbein, Anton Wilhelm (1734 – 1804), 1 work
Tischbein, Johann Friedrich August (Maastricht, 1750 – Heidelberg, 1812), 3 works

Born in the 19th century
Bakker Korff, Alexander Hugo (The Hague, 1824 – Leiden, 1882), 1 work
Keller, Johann Heinrich (Zurich, 1692 – The Hague, 1765), 1 work
Koekkoek, Barend Cornelis (Middelburg, 1803 – Cleve, 1862), 2 works

References
 Netherlands Institute for Art History
 Official website

Mauritshuis
Dutch painters
Mauritshuis